The 2021–22 season is the 95th season in the existence of FC Dynamo Kyiv and the club's 31st consecutive season in the top flight of Ukrainian football. In addition to the domestic league, Dynamo Kyiv are participating in this season's editions of the Ukrainian Cup, the Ukrainian Super Cup, and the UEFA Champions League.

Players

First-team squad

Transfers

Pre-season and friendlies

Competitions

Overall record

Ukrainian Premier League

League table

Matches

Ukrainian Cup

Ukrainian Super Cup

UEFA Champions League

Group stage

The draw for the group stage was held on 26 August 2021.

Notes

References

FC Dynamo Kyiv seasons
Dynamo Kyiv
Dynamo Kyiv